The initials LWS  may refer to:
 Lethal white syndrome, a genetic disorder of horses
 Lewiston-Nez Perce County Airport, Idaho, US
 LWS (aircraft manufacturer), Poland, 1936-1939
 Living With a Star
 Lewes railway station, a railway station in Sussex, England